México 1970In celebration of the 1970 World Cup (Mexico '70) the Mexican Football Federation held a tournament in two phases, before the world cup (Feb. 4 - May 10) and after the world cup (July 8 - Oct. 11).

Sixteen teams were seeded in two groups of eight teams, first four places of each group advanced to the "Championship Group"
and the last four teams of each group played in a "Consolation Group".

Laguna last place of the 1969-70 season, was scheduled to play against the last place of the Consolation Group in a 
playoff relegation series, but due to expansion to 18 teams for the 1970-71 season this series was cancelled, there was no relegation.

Overview

This tournament was contested by 16 teams, and Cruz Azul won the championship.

After this tournament Oro changed its name to Jalisco.

Teams

First stage

Group 1

Top four teams from each group advance to Championship Group.The bottom four plays in Consolation Group.

Results

Group 2

Results

Second stage

Championship group

Results

Consolation group

Results

Notes

References
Mexico - List of final tables (RSSSF)

Liga MX seasons
Mex
1969–70 in Mexican football
Mex
1970–71 in Mexican football